Samir Kochhar (born 23 May 1980) is an Indian actor and television presenter known for being the host of the pre-match Indian Premier League show, Extraaa Innings T20. He currently stars in Netflix India's Sacred Games.

Career
Kochhar started his career with Doordarshan's AIDS awareness cum travel show Haath Se Haath Mila which he anchored with Sugandha Garg. He made his Bollywood film debut in 2003 with Sumeer Sabharwal's bilingual film Valentine Days.

Kochhar made his television debut with Dangerous, a talk show on sex, which was broadcast on Zoom. He appeared as Rajat Kapur in the soap opera Bade Acche Lagte Hain. In 2005, he appeared in Mohit Suri's Zeher (2005) and followed it with the thriller Jannat (2008), where he played a police inspector.

Kochhar was part of Island City directed by Ruchika Oberoi, that received rave reviews at the Venice International Film Festival as well as the JIO MAMI Film Festival 2015 in Mumbai. He will also be seen in Mango Dreams, a feature film set in India, directed by American director John Unchurch.

Kochhar is also part of the CCL (Celebrity Cricket League) team Mumbai Heroes.

Kochhar had two commercial releases in 2016 - Sajid Nadiadwala's Housefull 3 with Akshay Kumar & Mango Dreams and Hume Tumse Pyaar Kitna with Karanvir Bohra directed by Lalit Mohan which is set to release in 2018

Personal life
Kochhar married his longtime girlfriend Radhika on 9 January 2010. In April 2015, they became parents to a baby boy whom they named Kabir and a baby girl named Sara in October 2017.

Filmography

Films

Television

References

External links
 
 

1980 births
Living people
Male actors in Hindi cinema
Indian male film actors
Male actors from New Delhi
21st-century Indian male actors